Dominique Bathenay (born 13 February 1954) is a French former professional footballer who played as a midfielder and coach.

Career
Bathenay played for AS Saint-Étienne from 1973 to 1978, and for Paris Saint-Germain from 1978 to 1985.

He was a member of the French squad that competed at the 1978 FIFA World Cup. He obtained a total number of twenty international caps for the France national football team, scoring four goals, in the years 1975-1982.

Honours

Club 
Saint-Étienne
Ligue 1: 1974, 1975, 1976
Coupe de France: 1974, 1975, 1977

Paris Saint-Germain
Coupe de France: 1982, 1983

References

External links

 
 
 

1954 births
Living people
Sportspeople from Ain
French footballers
France international footballers
Association football midfielders
AS Saint-Étienne players
Paris Saint-Germain F.C. players
FC Sète 34 players
Ligue 1 players
Ligue 2 players
1978 FIFA World Cup players
French football managers
FC Sète 34 managers
Stade de Reims managers
US Monastir (football) managers
AS Choisy-le-Roi managers
AS Saint-Étienne managers
Nîmes Olympique managers
Seychelles national football team managers
CS Sedan Ardennes managers
United Arab Emirates national football team managers
Expatriate football managers in Qatar
Expatriate football managers in the United Arab Emirates
Expatriate football managers in Seychelles
Footballers from Auvergne-Rhône-Alpes